KMZL (91.1 FM) is a non-commercial radio station licensed to serve Missoula, Montana. The station is owned by Faith Communications Corp. It airs a Contemporary Christian music format. The station is an affiliate of the Sounds of the Spirit Radio Network.

The station was assigned the KMZL call letters by the Federal Communications Commission on February 20, 1998.

License upgrade
On November 9, 2007, the FCC granted this station a construction permit to upgrade to a Class C1 licensed with an effective radiated power of 2,200 watts. On September 25, 2010, KMZL was granted a license to transmit at an effective radiated power of 2,200 watts.

Translators

References

External links
Sounds of the Spirit Radio Network

Contemporary Christian radio stations in the United States
MZL
Radio stations established in 1998
MZL